Big Island Lake Wilderness is a  remote protected area in the Munising Ranger District of the Hiawatha National Forest in the Upper Peninsula in the state of Michigan in the United States. The area is roughly bordered by County Road 437 on the south and County Road 445 on the west. The northeast boundary is Forest Road 2303 and the southern boundary is the abandoned railroad grade—Haywire Grade - Forest Road 8109.

References 

IUCN Category Ib
Protected areas of Schoolcraft County, Michigan
Wilderness areas of Michigan
Hiawatha National Forest